Marian Kotleba (born 7 April 1977) is a Slovak politician and leader of the far-right, neo-Nazi political party Kotlebists – People's Party Our Slovakia.

He served as the Governor of Banská Bystrica Region from 2013 to 2017. He was a presidential candidate in the 2019 election, in which he finished fourth.

Early life and education 
Born in Banská Bystrica in what was then Czechoslovakia, Kotleba attended the local Jozef Murgas High School. After finishing his education at a Grammar School he enrolled at the Matej Bel University receiving a Master's Degree in Pedagogics, later he once again enrolled at the Economics faculty at the same university and graduated with a master's degree in Economics.
After studies he taught at the Sports Grammar School specialising in sports.

Political views 

Kotleba supports Jozef Tiso and the First Slovak Republic, and he is openly against Roma people, Slovak National Uprising, NATO, the United States and the European Union. According to Hospodárske noviny, his position on the Holocaust is unclear. The BBC and The Economist have described him as a neo-Nazi. Kotleba has promoted the Zionist Occupation Government conspiracy theory and described Jews as "devils in human skin".

Kotleba has received a negative reception from the Slovak and foreign media due to his political views. Outlets such as Pravda, Denník SME, and Aktuality have characterized him as "extremist", "fascist", and "neo-Nazi".

Russia and Syria 
Kotleba is known for his sympathy towards the Russian Federation and the Syrian Arab Republic, having slogans during presidential campaign in 2019 such as "For Slavic unity, against war with Russia" or declaring on national television that "Bashar Al-Assad is a hero of the Middle-East". Kotleba also made trips to Syria, having met with Syrian House Speaker and Foreign Minister of Syria. It was revealed upon his departure from Banská Bystrica governorship from the documents found there, that he wanted to send a letter to Russian ambassador, in which he asked for assistance and profoundly wrote about his intention to buy a Russian car. He also spoke critically of American intervention in Iraq, Afghanistan, Yugoslavia, Libya, and Syria, once reading all of United States involvement in regime change in the Slovak Parliament.

Political career 
In 2003, Kotleba founded the far-right political party Slovak Togetherness. In 2007 the Slovak interior ministry banned the party from running and campaigning in elections, however it still functioned as a civic organisation. In 2009 he ran for the post of Governor of the Banská Bystrica region and received 10% of the votes. In the 2013 local elections he ran again and this time received approximately 20% of the votes, thereby securing a run-off against favourite Vladimír Maňka. Kotleba won the run-off by receiving 55% of the votes.

Kotleba's win was described as a "shock" by political analysts, who attributed it to deep anti-Romani sentiments in the region. Observers originally had said that they saw almost no chance for Kotleba to succeed in the second round against Maňka, but nonetheless found his strong showing "disturbing".

Prior to the 2016 election to the National Council, he renamed his party Ľudová strana Naše Slovensko (English: People's Party Our Slovakia) to Kotleba – Ľudová strana Naše Slovensko. Despite the polls suggesting the 1.5–3.5% gain of votes, the party rocketed to the parliament with a gain of over 8% of the vote. Despite elements of Neo-Nazism, the post-electoral polls suggest that his success was a result of dissatisfaction with the running of Slovakia and was seen as a protest vote against the ruling Smer – Sociálna demokracia and the fractured right. It was also linked to the fall of the Christian Democratic Movement, the Christian conservative party, and the European migrant crisis.

He was defeated in the Slovak regional elections of 2017 by an independent candidate, Ján Lunter.

In the 2020 parliamentary election his party gained 7.97%, which gave them 17 seats.

On 5 April 2022, Kotleba automatically lost his mandate of MP in the National Council as a consequence of being found guilty of demonstrating sympathy for a movement directed at suppression of fundamental rights and freedoms by the Supreme Court.

€1,488 cheques court case 
Kotleba was charged with demonstrating sympathy for a movement directed at suppression of fundamental rights and freedoms by publicly donating €1,488 cheques to various families. This combination of numbers is alleged to carry a white supremacist and Neo-Nazi message.

On 12 October 2020, a first-degree court found him guilty of a more serious crime than he was charged with (supporting and propagating a movement whose aim is the repression of human rights and freedoms, and doing so publicly). He was sentenced to four years and four months in a lowest-security prison. Kotleba appealed against the verdict. 

On 5 April 2022, the Supreme Court of the Slovak Republic changed the ruling of the first-degree court and found Kotleba guilty of the crime he was originally charged with. He received a suspended sentence of 6 months in prison.

Electoral history

Presidential

References 

1977 births
Living people
People's Party Our Slovakia politicians
Politicians from Banská Bystrica
Antiziganism in Slovakia
Far-right politics in Slovakia
Governors of Banská Bystrica Region
Candidates for President of Slovakia
Matej Bel University alumni
Slovak schoolteachers
Slovak fascists
21st-century Slovak politicians
Members of the National Council (Slovakia) 2016-2020
Members of the National Council (Slovakia) 2020-present